Anna Gyllander (born 1633 – floruit 1659) was a Swedish imposter, who during the reign of King Charles X of Sweden, presented herself to be the abdicated queen Christina of Sweden.

The fraud
In 1659, rumours reached King Charles X that there was a woman travelling about the country who claimed to be the former regent queen Christina, who abdicated and was living in Rome. The alleged "Queen Christina" had travelled about the country for at least a year, toasting "her brother the king" and firing gunshots to his honour. When asked if she was "Cristina Regina", she reportedly replied: "Ni säger så" (In English: "I hear you say that," or: "So you say"), and said that her parents were King Gustav II Adolf of Sweden and Queen Maria Eleonora. She never said straight out that she was Queen Christina, but gave the impression this was the case, and never denied it when others claimed she was.

The impostor was apprehended and identified as Anna Gyllander, daughter of Anders Gyllander from Norrköping and married to a cavalry captain from Courland in the division of Kruuse.

She defended herself by claiming that she had no idea how serious the whole thing would be considered and pleaded for mercy. The king sentenced her to one month imprisonment on bread and water, followed by banishment and exile from the kingdom and its provinces.

See also 
 Helga de la Brache
 Anna Ekelöf

References 

 Stålberg, Wilhelmina: Anteckningar om svenska qvinnor

Impostors
1633 births
Year of death missing
Swedish criminals
Impostor pretenders
17th-century Swedish people
1659 crimes
People of the Swedish Empire
17th-century criminals
Christina, Queen of Sweden
17th-century Swedish women